Huangjia is a town under the administration of Tongcheng City in southwestern Anhui province, China, located about  west of downtown Tongcheng in the eastern reaches of the Dabie Mountains. , it has 8 villages under its administration.

See also 
 List of township-level divisions of Anhui

References 

Towns in Anhui